The  Chicago Slaughter season was the team's fifth season as a professional indoor football franchise and second in the Indoor Football League (IFL). One of twenty-two teams competing in the IFL for the 2011 season, the Hoffman Estates, Illinois-based Chicago Slaughter were members of the Great Lakes Division of the United Conference.

Under the leadership of owner Jim McMahon, and head coach Steve McMichael, the team played their home games at the Sears Centre in Hoffman Estates, Illinois.

Schedule
Key:

Regular season

* = Kickoff Classic Game, before week 1 starts.

Postseason

Roster

Standings

References

Chicago Slaughter
Chicago Slaughter seasons
Chicago Slaughter